The Hrvatski Telekom Premijer liga, also known as HT Premijer liga or simply Premijer liga, is the first tier level men's professional basketball league in Croatia. It began in 1991, following the breakup of SFR Yugoslavia and therefore the Yugoslav League, and is organized by the Croatian Basketball Federation.

The HT Premijer liga, which is played under FIBA rules, currently consists of 12 teams. The most successful club is KK Cibona with 19 championship titles.

History 
Prior to 1991, clubs from Croatia played in the Yugoslav First Federal League. From the inaugural season in 1946, three Croatian clubs won 15 national championships in total; Zadar (six titles), Split (six titles), and Cibona (three titles).

Title holders 

 1991–92: Cibona
 1992–93: Cibona
 1993–94: Cibona
 1994–95: Cibona
 1995–96: Cibona
 1996–97: Cibona
 1997–98: Cibona
 1998–99: Cibona
 1999–00: Cibona
 2000–01: Cibona
 2001–02: Cibona VIP
 2002–03: Split CO
 2003–04: Cibona VIP
 2004–05: Zadar
 2005–06: Cibona VIP
 2006–07: Cibona VIP
 2007–08: Zadar
 2008–09: Cibona VIP
 2009–10: Cibona VIP
 2010–11: Zagreb CO
 2011–12: Cibona
 2012–13: Cibona
 2013–14: Cedevita
 2014–15: Cedevita
 2015–16: Cedevita
 2016–17: Cedevita
 2017–18: Cedevita
 2018–19: Cibona
 2019–20: Season canceled due to COVID-19 pandemic
 2020–21: Zadar
 2021–22: Cibona

Performance by club

Playoffs finals
Winners in matches between first &  fourth and second & third in regular season play against each other for the title

By club

All–time national champions 
Total number of national champions won by Croatian clubs. Table includes titles won during the Yugoslav First Federal League (1945–1992).

Players with 3 or more trophies

{| class="wikitable sortable" style="text-align: center;"
|-
! align="center"|Championships
! align="center"|Player
|-
|rowspan=2|8||align="left"| Davor Kus
|-
|align="left"| Davor Marcelić
|-
|7||align="left"| Marin Rozić
|-
|rowspan=6|6||align="left"| Dževad Alihodžić
|-
|align="left"| Marko Arapović
|-
|align="left"| Veljko Mršić
|-
|align="left"| Davor Pejčinović
|-
|align="left"| Slaven Rimac
|-
|align="left"| Ivica Žurić
|-
|rowspan=6|5||align="left"| Vladan Alanović
|-
|align="left"| Damir Mulaomerović
|-
|align="left"| Sandro Nicević
|-
|align="left"| Nikola Prkačin
|-
|align="left"| Josip Sesar
|-
|align="left"| Tomislav Zubčić
|-
|rowspan=10|4||align="left"| Lukša Andrić
|-
|align="left"| Luka Babić
|-
|align="left"| Miro Bilan
|-
|align="left"| Gordan Giriček
|-
|align="left"| Alan Gregov
|-
|align="left"| Lovro Mazalin
|-
|align="left"| Mate Skelin
|-
|align="left"| Marko Tomas
|-
|align="left"| Karlo Žganec
|-
|align="left"| Andrija Žižić
|-
|rowspan=15|3||align="left"| Ivan Grgat
|-
|align="left"| Toni Katić
|-
|align="left"| Bariša Krasić
|-
|align="left"| Marijan Mance
|-
|align="left"| Pavle Marčinković
|-
|align="left"| Damir Markota
|-
|align="left"| Džanan Musa
|-
|align="left"| Fran Pilepić
|-
|align="left"| Zdravko Radulović
|-
|align="left"| Ivan Ramljak
|-
|align="left"| Damir Rančić
|-
|align="left"| Marko Šamanić
|-
|align="left"| Roko Ukić
|-
|align="left"| Josip Vranković
|-

Coaches with 2 or more trophies

{| class="wikitable sortable" style="text-align: center;"
|-
! align="center"|Championships
! align="center"|Coach
|-
|rowspan=2|6||align="left"| Aleksandar Petrović
|-
|align="left"| Jasmin Repeša
|-
|4||align="left"| Veljko Mršić
|-
|3||align="left"| Dražen Anzulović
|-
|rowspan=2|2||align="left"| Velimir Perasović
|-
|align="left"| Neven Spahija
|-

See also
 Krešimir Ćosić Cup
 Croatian First Women's Basketball League

External links
Official website

Basketball leagues in Croatia
 
Professional sports leagues in Croatia